is a 2D platform game developed by Human Entertainment and published by HAL Laboratory for the Nintendo Entertainment System. It was originally released on December 21, 1990, in Japan and was released in January 1991 for the North American market before being released in Europe on February 20, 1992.

Plot

Players adopt the persona of 25-year-old Colonel Scott O'Connor, a military agent who has transferred his brain into raw binary code in order to combat a rogue program in the main defense computer. When O'Connor enters the system, his body forms the self-image of his ancestor, who was a kabuki actor.

In the year 2056, a virus has appeared in the main defense computer of the planet Earth. The origin and nature of the virus is unknown. Scott O'Connor volunteers to undergo an experimental transfer technology that converts his brain into raw binary code. He takes on the image of a Kabuki dancer, since the computer recognizes his great-great-grandfather as one. The virus in the virtual world takes on properties of an actual virus-it leaves behind debris, mutant creatures, and parasite environments of a biological nature. At the final level, it is revealed that the virus is of alien origin, having been picked up by the lost Hyperion probe launched to a neighboring planet. O'Connor stops it before the virus can order the Hyperion to fire its laser weapons and destroy the human population.

Gameplay
The field is generally side-scrolling, with a single room with a boss at the end of each level. O'Connor uses his long hair and chip-based weaponry to attack enemies inside the computer. The chip-weaponry includes the Energy Gun, Fusion Gun, Quantum Bombs and Remote-Controlled Bolo.

Regional differences
The Family Computer version was designed as a tie-in to the 1990 Kaizo Hayashi film  Zipang. In this version, a boy named Bobby Yano transforms into his samurai ancestor, Jigoku Gokurakumaru, when entering a supercomputer. References to the film were removed in the international releases.

References

External links

1990 video games
Fiction set in 2056
Cyberpunk video games
Human Entertainment games
Nintendo Entertainment System games
Nintendo Entertainment System-only games
Pack-In-Video games
Platform games
Side-scrolling video games
Single-player video games
Video games about viral outbreaks
Video games developed in Japan
Video games set in the 2050s
HAL Laboratory games